Blood Tide is a 1982 British horror film directed by Richard Jefferies, and starring James Earl Jones, José Ferrer, Lila Kedrova, Mary Louise Weller, Martin Kove, and Deborah Shelton. Its plot follows a young American couple visiting a Greek island where the husband's sister disappeared; they soon find that an ancient monster has been released, forcing the villagers to return to the practice of human sacrifice to appease it.

The film is also known as Bloodtide (in the US) and Demon Island (American TV title). It has been misconstrued as a public domain film and pirated by many distributors who copied it from DVDs. However, as per The Copyright Office, copyright is registered under Omega Entertainment, Inc. and the writer/producer of the film, Nico Mastorakis.

Plot
Neil and Sherry Grice, a young American couple, are visiting Greece in search of Neil's missing sister, Madeline, an artist who traveled to a remote island off the coast shortly before her disappearance. Upon arriving on the island, the couple are met by Nereus, the elderly mayor. While touring the island, Neil and Sherry see Madeline walking along a rocky hill, and follow her. They find her in the company of Frye, a middle-aged treasure hunter who is initially hostile toward Neil.

Later that night, Frye and Madeline's friend, Barbara, use Neil and Sherry's boat to visit a remote area of ocean off the island where Frye scuba dives into an underwater cavern. Inside, Frye gets drunk and uses a homemade bomb to unseal a walled-off tunnel which bears a sigil engraved above it. While Neil and Sherry visit the beach the next day with Madeline, Frye, and Barbara, Sherry observes Madeline acting strangely, in a seemingly trance-like state. When Sherry gifts Madeline an expensive perfume, Madeline pours the entire bottle over her body.

Madeline visits a convent on the island where she speaks with Sister Elena, and confides in a number of bizarre paintings she has uncovered after stripping the paint from the walls of the monastery. Among them are a portrait of a saint and a serpentine creature, which predates Christianity. Later, Barbara is attacked while swimming on the beach and killed in what appears to have been a shark attack. Her dismembered corpse is found by local children after it washes up on the shore. Meanwhile, several other young women in the town go missing.

While out boating, Neil and Sherry come across Frye's boat, and assume he is diving. Neil decides to follow him, and enters the underwater cave. Once inside, Frye tells Neil that it was Madeline's idea to come to the island in the first place, and that he had met her on the mainland prior—she was drawn to the island, and insistent they go there. He recounts how, after they arrived there, Madeline's personality began to change. Neil and Sherry visit the convent in an attempt to locate Madeline, but a nun forces them to leave. Meanwhile, Lethe, a young village girl, falls off a cliffside into the water while playing with the village boys. Her mother attempts to save her, as does Frye, who witnesses the accident from his boat. Frye saves Lethe, but her mother is eaten alive by the serpent.

That night, Frye, Neil, and Sherry attend a festival held by the villagers. Meanwhile, Madeline, back at the convent, witnesses the nuns holding a ceremonial prayer. A short time later, a bloodied  and shocked Sister Anna, the mother superior, stumbles into the festival. Neil, Sherry, and Frye rush to the convent and find it in disarray, the nuns all dead. Madeline, meanwhile, in a trance state, jumps from a cliff into the ocean, and swims to the underwater cavern. Frye and Neil follow after her. As Neil helps pull Madeline from the cave, Frye detonates it, blowing up the serpent and sacrificing his own life. Madeline, Neil, and Sherry depart the island at dawn.

Cast

Reception
Charles Tatum from eFilmCritic.com awarded the film 3 out of 4 stars, noting that, although the film wasn't perfect, it had its moments. In particular, Tatum commended the film's suspense scenes, and monster design. Author and film critic Leonard Maltin awarded the film 1.5 out of 4 stars, stating that the film's Greek scenery was the film's only distinction, calling it "[a] substandard programmer". TV Guide offered similar criticism, awarding it 1/5 stars, calling it "An embarrassing picture for all concerned, but fun for devotees of "bad enough to be good" movies."

References

External links
 
 
 
 

1982 films
1982 horror films
1980s monster movies
British horror films
British monster movies
1980s English-language films
English-language Greek films
Films set in Greece
Greek horror films
Films scored by Shuki Levy
21st Century Film Corporation films
1980s British films